Kristján Pálsson (born 1 December 1944) is an Icelandic former politician. He was a member of parliament from 1995 to 2003 for the Independence Party. In 2003, he resigned from the party and served out the remineder of his term as an independent.

References

External links 
 Biography at Alþingi

1944 births
Living people
Kristjan Palsson